Travis Vengroff (born January 20, 1987) is an American musician, writer, producer, actor, and podcaster. He is best known for his work on the podcasts The White Vault, Don't Mind, VAST Horizon, Liberty, and Dark Dice.

Biography
Vengroff was born in Centerport, New York, and moved to Sarasota, Florida when he was three. As a child, Vengroff liked to listen to audiobooks which led him to podcasting. He also was engaged in acting and real estate. In 2006-2009, Travis Vengroff studied acting at the New York Film Academy, game design at the Art Institute of Pittsburgh, and business management at USF.

Career 
On November 17, 2011, Vengroff became the president of Vengroff Williams Inc. From 2013 to 2019, he also worked with his father and brother in real estate in Sarasota, Bradenton, Orlando, and Memphis.

Vengroff started creating fiction podcasts with K.A. Statz in 2015. 

 2015 — the audio drama series Liberty: Critical Research
 2016 — an anthology horror series Liberty: Tales from the Tower 
 2017 — the found footage horror fiction audio drama The White Vault that was recognized with the Webby Award, 14 Audio Verse Awards in 2020 and a Mark Time Award
 2018 — a horror actual play podcast Dark Dice with Jeff Goldblum; Liberty: Vigilance, a play audio drama podcast with Ashly Burch, Eric Nelsen and Sainty Nelsen, Dave Fennoy, Lani Minella, and George Lowe
 2019 — VAST Horizon, a science fiction audio drama that won 4 Audio Verse Awards and a W3 Silver Award in 2020
 2022 - Don't Mind, a mystery anthology series starring Adjoa Andoh, Marcus Bentley, and Dan Pye.  

In July 2015, he started to work on Fool & Scholar Productions with Statz, and it was incorporated in December 2016. In 2016, Vengroff and Statz became Parsec Award finalists (“Best New Speculative Fiction Team”), and Liberty: Critical Research was an Audio Verse Award finalist. Vengroff became one of the founding members of the Audio Drama Coalition (March 2018) and the Audio Drama Roundtable (December 2018). He was a speaker at New York Comic Con, Austin Film Festival, Podfest, Emerald City Comic Con, MAGFest, the USO, and TEDx.

Publications
In 2013-2018, Vengroff was a regular contributor to the Russian magazine Mir Fantastiki. He is the writer and creator of the Liberty comic book series and podcast Dark Dice. Since 2018, several adventures for Dungeons & Dragons on the DM's Guild became Platinum bestsellers. Since 2015, Vengroff has released several Liberty stories and books.

Music 
In 2005, Vengroff was an accordionist and founded the band Random Encounter and was the only member to remain involved until 2015 (under the nickname Careless). Random Encounter was recognized as the Best Rock Act in Central Florida (2013), the Best Indie Act in Central Florida (2012), and the Best Folk Act in Central Florida (2011) by the Orlando Weekly.

He founded a second band, Careless Juja, in 2011. It took part in the Dwelling of Duels internet music competition and won five awards from 2011 to 2019. The album Those Who Fight was released in 2021.

In 2019-2022, Vengroff directed an orchestra, a 40-person choir, and more than 30 medieval instruments for the soundtrack of the Dark Dice podcast.

Discography
Studio albums
 Neo Symbiance (EP) – Random Encounter (2006)
 Random Encounter (Self Titled) (Demo LP) - Random Encounter (2010)
 Unavenged - Random Encounter (2011)
 Pixel Glass (LP) – Careless Juja (2011)
 72 Hours in The Ocean with your Mother (Single) - Random Encounter (2012)
 Dead Labs (Single) - Random Encounter (2013)
 Cool Cool Cool-laboration (Single) - Random Encounter + Random Encounters (2013)
 Let Me Tell You a Story - Random Encounter (2013)
 The Big Blue LP (LP) - Random Encounter (2014)
 Prof. Layton and the Bay Harbor Butcher (LP) – Careless Juja (2014)
 Super Galaxy Squadron original Soundtrack - Random Encounter (2015)
 Legend of the Boar Knight (LP) – Careless Juja (2015)
 For Naughty Children (EP) – Careless Juja (2015)
 Lost Frequency - Random Encounter (2017)
 Careless Juja World Tour Live Album (LP) – Careless Juja (2017)
 Those Who Fight (LP) – Careless Juja (2020) 
 Gamble Your Sanity (LP) – Dark Dice Soundtrack (2021)
 Season of the Allshadow (LP) – Dark Dice Soundtrack (2022)

Guest Appearances
 Welcome to World 2 - Game Music 4 All (2008)
 Bitavenged - Bitavenged (2012)
 Spectrum of Mana - Nate Horsefall (2013)
 Final Fantasy VII Gametabs Tribute Album - Gametabs.net (2014)
 Super VG Christmas Party - Patient Corgi (2014, with Random Encounter)
 Rogue Legacy: Reborn- Tettix & A Shell in the Pit (2014)
 The Legend of Zelda Tribute Album - Gametabs.net (2015)
 SOUND WAVES: A Tribute to Ecco the Dolphin - Patient Corgi (2016)
 Tribute Album 64 - Patient Corgi (2016)
 Video Games Live: Bonus Round 3 - Video Games Live (2016)
 Chronicles of Time - Nate Horsefall (2016)
 Final Fantasy I - The Legacy - Pixel Mixers (2017)
 SPIRA: Music from Final Fantasy X (Zanarkand Mix) - Materia Collective (2017)
 Secret of Mana - Whispers from a Verdant Grove - Pixel Mixers (2018)
 EIDOLON: Music From Final Fantasy IX - Materia Collective (2019)

References

External links
 

1987 births
American male writers
American male musicians
American accordionists
American podcasters
American male voice actors
American people of Italian descent
American people of Jewish descent
People from Sarasota, Florida
Living people
University of South Florida alumni
American rock singers
Record producers from Florida
21st-century American singers
Singers from Florida
21st-century American male singers